Morkheri is a village in Rohtak district of Haryana in India. Morkheri   The Village now hold multiple  Jat Gotra ethnicity. The 60% of the population has emigrated out to the cities. The village has many prominent residents and has contributed to the Military leaders, Engineering and Medical fields. 

The village is a mere 30 km from Delhi border. Because if its significant location it is a developing village. At present the village has 1 government senior secondary school and also a private school. Recently the village has got its first college also named Vikramaditya Polytechnic College. According to India Business report by BBC London the people are engaged in agricultural activities.

History
It is a small village with no ancient significance.

Population
Approximately 2000 people according to 2011 census

Transport system
This village don't have any transport system. Village is situated on a approach road with no connectivity to cities. Only one bus runs at 2pm in the evening. Otherwise village residents have to use their own vehicle for transport.

Education
Senior Secondary Government School
Vikramaditya College of education, (B.Ed, M.Ed. D.El.Ed)
Recognized By NCTE Jaipur and affiliated to Chaudhary Ranbir Singh University Jind and SCERT, Gurgaon
 Vikramaditya Group of Educational Institutes
B.Ed and D.El.ED
 Vikramaditya Polytechnic
Vikramaditya Global School (Residential)
Affiliated to CBSE Coming soon

Demography
It has sex ratio of 847 and literacy rate of 80% in males and 55% in females.

Jat clans
Lakra, Sehrawat and Sangwan in majority

Notable personalities

 Dr. Manoj Kumar (Dr. Manoj Lakra), Professor at Kobe University, Japan.

References

External links
 rohtak.nic.in
 www.timesofindia.indiatimes.com

Villages in Rohtak district